The 2006 United States Senate election in Missouri was held November 7, 2006, to decide who would serve as senator for Missouri between January 3, 2007, and January 3, 2013. The incumbent was Republican Jim Talent. Talent was elected in a special election in 2002 when he narrowly defeated incumbent Democrat Jean Carnahan. Carnahan had been appointed to the Senate seat following the posthumous election of her husband Mel Carnahan, who had died in a plane crash shortly before the 2000 election. Talent's Democratic opponent was Missouri State Auditor Claire McCaskill. Early on the morning of November 8, Talent conceded defeat to McCaskill, having faced considerable political headwinds. Talent lost the election with 47% of the vote, to 50% of the vote for McCaskill. This was the last election an incumbent Republican senator lost in Missouri.

Candidates

Democratic 
 Claire McCaskill, State Auditor of Missouri and former State Representative

Libertarian 
 Frank Gilmour, small business owner

Progressive 
 Lydia Lewis, retired functional systems analyst

Republican 
 Jim Talent, incumbent U.S. Senator since 2002

Factors 
The election was always expected to be very close, which seems fitting for a seat that has changed hands twice, both by very narrow margins, within the last six years. In 2000, the late Missouri Governor Mel Carnahan, a Democrat, narrowly defeated incumbent Republican Senator John Ashcroft 50% to 48%. Mel Carnahan died in a plane crash before election day, so his wife Jean Carnahan was appointed to the seat after the election. Two years later in a special election held for the seat, incumbent Senator Jean Carnahan lost an even closer election to former Congressman Talent, 50% to 49%.

State politics 
Missouri was seen as the nation's bellwether state throughout the 20th century. It had voted for the winner of every presidential election since 1900, except for 1956 (when the state narrowly favored Adlai Stevenson over Dwight D. Eisenhower). Missouri's bellwether status was due to the fact that it not only voted for the electoral victor, but that its returns usually mirrored national returns.

The state itself is a geographically central state, bordered by both the edges of Southern and Midwestern regions. In statewide contests for much of the 20th century, Missouri favored the Democratic Party. In recent elections, the Republican Party (GOP) has emerged in statewide contests. The election of 2004 was an important one; as George W. Bush was re-elected he carried Missouri. But this time his margin in the state was greater than it was nationwide. Bush won the Presidency 51% to 48%, he carried Missouri 53% to 46%. This trend had begun in 2000, when Bush lost the national popular vote to Al Gore 47% to 48% but still won Missouri, 50% to 47%. Bush's victory also saw Republicans triumph in several statewide contests; Senator Kit Bond was re-elected by a decisive 56% to 43% margin and Matt Blunt won the election for Governor, narrowly defeating state auditor Claire McCaskill 51% to 48%. The GOP also captured control of the state legislature for the first time in eighty years.

Early campaign 
Talent, anticipating a tough re-election battle and attempting to dissuade challengers, had accumulated a large campaign fund. For most of 2005, he had no opposition. State Senator Chuck Graham had briefly entered the race early in the year, but dropped out soon after. However, on August 30, 2005, Democrat Claire McCaskill announced her intention to run for Talent's Senate seat.

McCaskill started with a large financial disadvantage, but she was also an experienced candidate with high name recognition. McCaskill had run two successful campaigns for state auditor. She was also a candidate for governor in 2004, when she defeated the incumbent Democratic Governor Bob Holden in the primary election but lost with 48% of the vote in the general election.

Both Talent and McCaskill faced unknowns in their respective primaries on August 8, 2006, and defeated them soundly.

Talent started statewide advertising on August 1, 2006, forcing some observers to suggest that Talent was on the ropes and therefore needed to reassert his image (damaged recently by his "flip-flopping" on stem cell research, his opposition to raising the minimum wage and a general feeling of antipathy from the body politic regarding his lack of notable achievements while in the Senate) and pull ahead in a statistical dead heat.

McCaskill and Talent agreed to debate each other on Meet the Press on October 8, 2006.

Significance 
The Missouri contest was seen as vitally important to control of the United States Senate; as a toss-up election between two strong candidates, the race was expected to attract a lot of interest as well as money spent on ads and turning out supporters. If Talent won, then a Democratic takeover of the U.S. Senate depended upon victories in Tennessee, where the Republican Bob Corker won, and Virginia, where Democrat Jim Webb won; the Democrats needed to win six seats to take control of the chamber with 51 seats. To do this, they would need to retain their 19 incumbent seats, win the four Republican-held seats of Montana, Ohio, Rhode Island, and Pennsylvania (where Democratic chances seemed above 50%, and Democrats won all 4.) and two of the following three "toss-up" races: Missouri, Tennessee and Virginia.

November ballot propositions 
A June 19–22, 2006 Research 2000 poll showed Talent's favorability rating was 47%-46%, with 7% having no opinion.
Soon after a St. Louis Post-Dispatch poll was released showing McCaskill with 49% favorability to Talent's 43%.

It is believed that statewide ballot issues drove the November 2006 vote. Talent was on the opposite of the majority of voters in this poll on just about every issue: 66% of Missouri voters favored raising the minimum wage to $6.50 an hour; 62% of Missouri voters favored raising taxes to replace Medicaid funding cut by the current Republican Governor, Matt Blunt; 54% opposed a law that would require all Missourians to show a photo ID before they vote; 58% favored campaign donation limitations; and 66% favored restoring Medicaid coverage to about 90,000 Missourians who lost coverage when Blunt and the Republican legislature tightened eligibility requirements.

Perhaps most importantly, 62% favored a ballot proposal that would allow all types of embryonic stem cell research allowed under federal law - a measure Talent had recently announced that he was against.

Embryonic stem cell research 
Since joining the Senate in 2002, Talent had supported federal legislation that would ban stem cell research. This included co-sponsoring a bill (S.658) sponsored by Senator Sam Brownback which would ban all forms of human cloning, including the cloning and destruction of human embryos.

On February 10, 2006, Talent withdrew his support for the bill, citing the need to balance research and protection against human cloning. This move followed criticism by Talent's Democratic opponent in the 2006 election, Claire McCaskill, as well as pressure from Missouri business interests that oppose restrictions on stem cell research. Though this reversal was widely criticized as being due to politics, Talent told the Associated Press, "The technology is changing all the time and so I'm always considering whether there is a better way to strike the balance.". Talent suggests that moral concerns might be put to rest through a possible future scientific breakthrough - replicating embryonic stem cells without the use of cloned embryos.

Proposed Constitutional Amendment 2 would amend the state constitution and allow, in line with federal law, stem cell research and treatment. On May 1, 2006, Talent announced his opposition to the proposed ballot-initiative.   Stem cell research and treatment is working up to be a divisive issue for many Republicans and is taking a particular prominence in Missouri. In the senate, he subsequently voted against expanding federal funds for embryonic stem cell research in July 2006.

Minimum wage 
Proposition B would raise the minimum wage in the state to $6.50 per hour, or to the level of the federal minimum wage if that is higher, with subsequent adjustments for inflation.  This is another issue where Talent was opposed to majority opinion in Missouri, which Democrats hoped would hurt him at the polls.

Fundraising 
Talent had a huge cash-on-hand advantage over McCaskill. Because of the way FEC filing works, Talent's numbers include the money he raised during his 2002 special election campaign. Totals are through July 19.

Commercial controversy

Overview 
Actor Michael J. Fox, who has Parkinson's disease, frequently appears in political advertising to support candidates with a history of supporting embryonic stem cell research. In 2004, Fox appeared in a television commercial for Republican Arlen Specter's 2004 Senate campaign. In the commercial, sponsored by Specter's re-election campaign, Fox says Specter "gets it" and Specter's voice is heard saying "there is hope."

In late October, he appeared in a  television campaign commercial for Claire McCaskill. Her opponent, Talent, was against both taxpayer- and privately funded embryonic stem cell research, and in the commercial Fox correctly stated that Talent wanted to criminalize such research.

The commercial made national headlines. The commercial had a statistical impact on the way people voted.

Reactions 
Rush Limbaugh, conservative radio talk show host, commented on the TV commercial, saying that Fox was "really shameless" and that he was "either off his medication or acting." Limbaugh was speculating that Fox may have intentionally not taken his medication. According to The Washington Post, Limbaugh also told his listeners that Fox was "exaggerating the effects of the disease... he's moving all around and shaking, and it's purely an act."

Elaine Richman, a neuroscientist, stated, "Anyone who knows the disease well would regard his movement as classic severe Parkinson's disease. Any other interpretation is misinformed."

Limbaugh followed up on October 25, 2006, saying, "When you wade into political life you have every right to say what you want, but you cannot in turn argue that no one has the right to take you on."

On October 26, Fox said, "The irony of it is that I was too medicated." He added to Katie Couric that his jumpy condition, as he spoke to her, reflected "a dearth of medication — not by design. I just take it, and it kicks in when it kicks in."  He further laughed, "That's funny — the notion that you could calculate it for effect."

General election

Debates 
Complete video of debate, September 15, 2006
Complete video of debate, October 8, 2006
Complete video of debate, October 16, 2006
Complete video of debate, October 18, 2006

Predictions

Polling

Results 
When the polls closed in Missouri on election night the race was, as expected, too close to call. With 85% of the vote in and with still no call, McCaskill claimed victory. At the time McCaskill declared victory, she was ahead by a vote margin of 867,683 to Talent's 842,251 votes; in percentage terms, with 85% of the vote in, McCaskill led Talent, 49% to 48%. Finally, at 11:38 P.M. Central Time the Associated Press called McCaskill as the winner. St. Louis County, adjacent to St. Louis, and Jackson County, home of Kansas City, are probably what pushed McCaskill over the finish line.

See also 
 2006 United States Senate elections
 2006 United States House of Representatives elections

References

External links 
Official campaign websites (Archived)
 Claire McCaskill
 Jim Talent
 Frank Gilmour
 Lydia Lewis

Missouri
2006
2006 Missouri elections